Lagenostoma is a genus of seed ferns (Pteridospermatophyta), based on ovules preserved in coal balls from the Six Inch Coal of the Hough Hill Colliery near Stalybridge, England. Distinctive stalked glands enabled Oliver and Scott to attribute these seeds to fernlike foliage of Sphenopteris hoeningshauseni in the same coal balls. This was the first recognition that some Carboniferous fernlike leaves had seeds, and so were not pteridophytes, but rather Pteridospermatophyta, or seed ferns. The realization that seed plants as well as spore plants had fernlike leaves was a major contribution to the evolutionary history of plants.

Description 
Lagenostoma has large (7–8 mm) ovules arranged in branching structures. The genus name comes from the distinctive prepollen receiving structure of a cone blocked by a growing plug of tissue.

Whole plant associations 
Lagenostoma lomaxii from the Late Carboniferous Six Inch Coal of the upper Millstone grit near Stalybridge UK, has distinctive stalked glands linking it with stems of Lyginopteris oldhamiana and Sphenopteris hoeninghausenii.

References

External links 

Pteridospermatophyta
Pennsylvanian plants
Prehistoric plant genera
Fossil record of plants
Pennsylvanian first appearances
Pennsylvanian extinctions